The B.A Swallow was a British light aircraft of the 1930s. It was a license-built version by the British Klemm Aeroplane Company (which later became known as the British Aircraft Manufacturing Co.) of the German Klemm L.25.  A total of 135 were built.

Design and development
The German aircraft manufacturer Klemm developed a successful low-powered light aeroplane, the Klemm L.25, which first flew in 1927, of which over 600 were produced.  Several were sold to British owners, where they proved popular, so the British dealer for the L.25, Major E.F Stephen, set up the "British Klemm Aeroplane Company" at London Air Park, Hanworth, Middlesex to produce a version of the L.25 under license.

The prototype of the licensed version, known as the B.K. Swallow, first flew at Hanworth in November 1933.  It was an all-wooden cantilever monoplane, with tandem cockpits accommodating two persons, and was powered by a 75 hp (56 kW) Salmson 9 or 85 hp (63 kW) Pobjoy Cataract radial engine.  It differed from the German original with its more powerful engines and local strengthening to meet British airworthiness requirements.

In 1935 a revised version of the Swallow was introduced, with the curved wing tips, rudder and tailplane inherited from the Klemm original being made straight and with revised fuselage top decking.  At this time the company changed its name to the British Aircraft Manufacturing Co., so the revised version was known as the B.A Swallow II.  Swallow IIs were produced powered either by the Cataract or the Cirrus Minor inline engine, production continuing until 1938, with a total of 107 Swallow IIs produced, following on from the 28 Swallows I.

Operational history

The Swallow, which proved to be robust, was popular in service.  The majority were sold to private owners or flying schools within the United Kingdom.  At the outbreak of the Second World War, many were taken by the Military, most being issued to the Air Training Corps for use as instructional airframes.

A number of Swallows were taken on charge during late 1940 by the Royal Air Force's Glider Training Squadron within the Central Landing Establishment based at RAF Ringway near Manchester. Their propellers were removed and tow hooks were attached to each wing leading edge. The Swallows were towed singly, in pairs and in threes by retired Armstrong Whitworth Whitley bombers before being released to glide to their simulated "target" on the airfield. This unusual procedure was adopted to assist the evaluation of the future use of heavy gliders in assaults on enemy positions.

One Swallow was impressed into RNZAF service in September 1939 and was used as a communications aircraft from September 1939 to April 1940.

Some 17 Swallows survived to fly again under private ownership after the war, with a few remaining airworthy in 2008.

Variants
B.K. Swallow
Initial production version, powered by  British-Salmson A.D.9R or  Pobjoy Cataract II engines, 28 built (six with Salmson engine).
B.A. Swallow II
Revised production version, with modified structure to simplify production, powered by  Pobjoy Cataract II engine or  Blackburn Cirrus Minor, 107 built (60 with Cataract, 47 with Cirrus).

Operators

Royal Air Force
Royal Navy – one aircraft used in Ceylon for communications duties.

Royal New Zealand Air Force

Spanish Air Force – One aircraft only.

Specifications (B.K. Swallow II)

See also

References

Jackson, A.J. British Civil Aircraft since 1919 Volume 1. London: Putnam, 1974. .
 Scholefield, R.A. Manchester Airport. Stroud: Sutton Publishing Ltd, 1998. .
 Smith, J.R. and Kay, Antony L. German Aircraft of the Second World War. London: Putnam, 1972. .

External links

 B.A. Swallow – British Aircraft Directory

1930s British civil trainer aircraft
Swallow
Single-engined tractor aircraft
Aircraft first flown in 1933